Kutná Hora District is a district in the Central Bohemian Region of the Czech Republic. Its capital is the town of Kutná Hora.

Administrative division
Kutná Hora District is divided into two administrative districts of municipalities with extended competence: Kutná Hora and Čáslav.

List of municipalities
Towns are marked in bold and market towns in italics:

Adamov -
Bernardov -
Bílé Podolí -
Bludov -
Bohdaneč -
Brambory -
Bratčice -
 Čáslav -
Čejkovice -
Černíny -
Červené Janovice -
Čestín -
Chabeřice -
Chlístovice -
Chotusice -
Církvice -
Dobrovítov -
Dolní Pohleď -
Drobovice -
Hlízov -
Horka I -
Horka II -
Horky -
Horušice -
Hostovlice -
Hraběšín -
Kácov -
Kluky -
Kobylnice -
Košice -
Krchleby -
Křesetice -
 Kutná Hora -
Ledečko -
Malešov -
Miskovice -
Močovice -
Nepoměřice -
Nové Dvory -
Okřesaneč -
Onomyšl -
Opatovice I -
Paběnice -
Pertoltice -
Petrovice I -
Petrovice II -
Podveky -
Potěhy -
Rašovice -
Rataje nad Sázavou -
Rohozec -
Řendějov -
Samopše -
Schořov -
Šebestěnice -
Semtěš -
Slavošov -
Soběšín -
Souňov -
Staňkovice -
Starkoč -
Štipoklasy -
Suchdol -
Sudějov -
Svatý Mikuláš -
Třebešice -
Třebětín -
Třebonín -
Tupadly -
Uhlířské Janovice -
Úmonín -
Úžice -
Vavřinec -
Vidice -
Vinaře -
Vlačice -
Vlastějovice -
Vlkaneč -
Vodranty -
Vrdy -
Záboří nad Labem -
Žáky -
Zbizuby -
Zbraslavice -
Zbýšov -
Žehušice -
Žleby -
 Zruč nad Sázavou

Geography

The northeast of the district is rather flat with agricultural land, the southwest is dominated by hilly forested terrain. The territory extends into four geomorphological mesoregions: Upper Sázava Hills (most of the territory), Central Elbe Table (north), Vlašim Uplands (small part in the southwest) and Iron Mountains (small part in the north).

The most important rivers in the northern part of the district are the Elbe which, however, crosses the territory only briefly, and its tributary the Klejnárka River. The southern part is drained by the Sázava River.

There are no large-scale protected areas.

Demographics

Most populated municipalities

Economy
The largest employers with its headquarters in Kutná Hora District and at least 500 employers are:

Transport
There is no motorway in the district territory, although the D1 motorway from Prague to Brno runs just beyond the southwestern border of the district. The most important road that passess through the district is the I/38 from Jihlava to Kolín.

Sights

The historic centre of Kutná Hora, including the Sedlec Abbey and its ossuary, was designated a UNESCO World Heritage Site in 1995 because of its outstanding architecture and its influence on subsequent architectural developments in other Central European city centres.

The most important monuments in the district, protected as national cultural monuments, are:
Italian Court in Kutná Hora
Church of Saint Barbara in Kutná Hora
Kačina Castle
Žleby Castle
Church of Saint James the Great in Jakub

The best-preserved settlements and landscapes, protected as monument reservations and monument zones, are:
Kutná Hora (monument reservation)
Čáslav
Malešov
Nové Dvory
Rataje nad Sázavou
Losiny
Landscape around Žehušice, including the Deer Park Žehušice and Kačina castle park

The most visited tourist destinations are the Church of Saint Barbara in Kutná Hora, Sedlec Ossuary in Kutná Hora, and Kačina Castle with the Czech Countryside Museum.

References

External links

Kutná Hora District profile on the Czech Statistical Office's website

 
Districts of the Czech Republic